Germán González may refer to:

Germán González (footballer, born 1947), Colombian football midfielder
Germán González (footballer, born 1952), Colombian football manager and former defender
Germán González (baseball) (born 1962), Venezuelan baseball player